This is a list of notable MBA schools in India.

See also
 List of business schools in Asia
 List of business schools in Hyderabad, India

References

 MBA schools, Business Schools, Management Schools